Phillip Tahmindjis (born 7 February 1968 in Kensington, New South Wales) is a former ice speed skater from Australia, who represented his native country in three consecutive Winter Olympics, starting in 1988 in Calgary, Canada.

Tahmindjis also competed in natural ice races during his time in Europe and is a life-long cyclist.

Achievements
World Allround Speed Skating Championships for Men (3 participations):
 1990, 1991, 1992
 Best result 28th in 1992
World Sprint Speed Skating Championships for Men (4 participations):
 1987, 1989, 1993, 1994
 Best result 28th in both 1989 and 1993
World Junior Speed Skating Championships (2 participations):
 1985, 1986
 Best result 12th in 1986

Personal records

References

 SkateResults
 DESG

1968 births
Living people
Sportspeople from Sydney
Australian male speed skaters
Speed skaters at the 1988 Winter Olympics
Speed skaters at the 1992 Winter Olympics
Speed skaters at the 1994 Winter Olympics
Olympic speed skaters of Australia